Kagando Hospital, also known as Kagando Mission Hospital, is a hospital in the Western Region of Uganda.

Location
The hospital is located in Kagando Village,  in Kasese District, Rwenzururu sub-region, at the foothills of the Rwenzori Mountains, and close to Queen Elizabeth National Park.

The coordinates of Kagando Mission Hospital are 0°03'47.0"N, 29°53'53.0"E (Latitude:0.063056; Longitude:29.898069).

Overview
Kagando Hospital is a rural community hospital, owned and administered by Kagando Rural Development Center (KARUDEC), a Christian missionary NGO that also owns and manages Kagando School of Nursing and Midwifery and other community outreach programs in the area. KARUDEC is affiliated with the  Church of Uganda.  The hospital has 250 beds and averages about 20,000 annual outpatient visits and about 18,000 annual inpatient admissions. The professional staff includes: 2 surgeons, 2 physicians, one anesthesiologist, one physiotherapist and a number of nurses and midwives.

Every morning at 8 am in the KARUDEC Chapel, there is a service for all doctors, nurses, nursing students and medical students, in which the hospital patients and local issues are prayed for.  After the church service, everyone goes to do their work.  Kagando hospital is a favorite choice for medical students in the Ugandan medical schools and foreign medical students who may volunteer to spend their elective (part of their training which involves work overseas) at Kagando.

In April 2018, Kagando Hospital joined the list of hospitals in Africa that have adopted Stre@mline Health for management of its hospital processes. All departments of the hospital including registration, triage, consultation, laboratory, pharmacy, stores, finance and administration will use Stre@mline. Stre@mline Health is a well suited  Electronic Medical Records for Africa. The hospital is also looking forward to adopting the insurance model that is in built into Stre@mline Health. This will be great for helping very poor communities to access high quality health care.

History
The hospital was established in 1965, by the African Inland Missionaries.  In the beginning, it treated primarily patients afflicted with leprosy.  Today, the specialty wards at the hospital include the following:

1. Pediatric Ward 2. Male Medical Ward 3. Female Medical Ward 4. Male Surgical Ward 5. Female Surgical Ward 6. Maternity Ward 
7. Leprosy Ward 8. Tuberculosis Ward and 9. Neonatal Unit.

Community Outreach
In response to the needs of the community, the hospital established outreach programs, including the following:

Kagando School of Nursing and Midwifery was established in 1965 to respond to the shortage of nurses and midwives in the community. Today, student capacity of nearly 250 students There was a severe outbreak of cholera in 1978, following which, a community-based healthcare project was established, which is involved in malaria control, water supply and sanitation.

Due to increasing malnutrition in the community, particularly among children, an agricultural extension program was started in 1981. Today, those activities consist of an Agriculture Extension Program, including a KARUDEC Farm on the  campus.

A chaplaincy at the centre of all the programmes. The Kagando Chaplainncy is under the South Rwenzori Diocese of the Church of Uganda.

A Microfinance program, a kindergarten and elementary school with nearly 700 pupils and a functional Adult Literacy Program were also established.

In 1986 Kagando Hospital (250 beds), and its outreach activities rebranded as Kagando Rural Development Center (KARUDEC), an NGO.

The community in KARUDEC's service area is intimately involved in the NGO's activities. The people in the community are generally poor, with limited means and often with limited formal education. Despite the odds, KARUDEC is slowly making a positive impact.

See also
 List of hospitals in Uganda

References

External links
US Website of Kagando Mission Hospital Foundation
UK Website of Friends of Kagando

Hospitals in Uganda
Hospitals established in 1965
1965 establishments in Uganda
Leper hospitals
Kasese District
Rwenzururu sub-region
Western Region, Uganda